Enaam Elgretly (انعام الجريتلي), also transliterated as Inaam El Gretly, is an Egyptian actress.

Life 
Elgretly was born in Cairo, and is an elder sister of actress Ahlam Elgretly. In 1966 she graduated from the Institute of Dramatic Art. During a career spanning half a century, she appeared in many TV series and films. The most famous is the series Man and six women (راجل وست ستات), in which she appeared after the third part of the series.

References

1944 births
Living people
Egyptian film actresses
Egyptian television actresses
Actresses from Cairo
20th-century Egyptian actresses
21st-century Egyptian actresses